= Liberal Democratic Alliance Party of Albania =

Liberal Democratic Alliance Party of Albania (in Albanian: Partia Aleanca Liberal Demokrate e Shqipërisë) is a political party in Albania, led by Pirro Prifti.
